Magician is a 1967 Soviet drama film directed by Pyotr Todorovsky. It was the Experimental Creative Studio's (subdivision of Mosfilm) first film.

Plot 
The film is about an elderly magician  a good man, shy, but at the same honest and principled. Because of the lack of shows, he is forced to do house concerts. Once Kukushkin meets a young beauty by the name of Elena, and falls in love with her. He and Elena arrange something like a wedding, but the young wife is only interested in making important connections, afterwards she throws out the magician. Kukushkin does not become discouraged and stands in the yard distributing oranges to children. He realizes that the greatest magic is to give people the best that you have.

Cast
 Zinovy Gerdt as Viktor Mikhailovich Kukushkin, an illusionist
 Alla Larionova as Elena Ivanovna
 Yevgeny Leonov as Stepan Nikolayevich Rossomakhin, the boss of Kukushkin
 Olga Gobzeva as Lily, the daughter of Kukushkin
 Leonid Dyachkov as Pavel, the investigator
 Vladimir Basov as pop entertainer-satirist
 Svetlana Kharitonova as Sasha, Dima's wife
 Edward Abert as Dima, the juggler
 Oleg Gerasimov as episode
 Valentina Titova as Dasha, editor
 Konstantin Zaitsev as episode
 Inessa Drovosekova as wife of Rossomakhin

Criticism
 Sergey Kudryavtsev's   Review

References

External links
 

1967 films
Films directed by Pyotr Todorovsky
Films about magic and magicians
Soviet drama films
Mosfilm films
Soviet black-and-white films
1960s Russian-language films
1967 drama films